Riverside, also known as the John Langdon Jones House, is a historic home located near Grandin, Caldwell County, North Carolina.  It was built about 1860 and is a two-story, three bay, brick, Greek Revival-style house with a rear ell.  It features a center-bay, two-tier front porch with decorative woodwork. The landscape is considered a contributing site.

The house was listed on the National Register of Historic Places in 2004.

References

Houses on the National Register of Historic Places in North Carolina
Greek Revival houses in North Carolina
Houses completed in 1860
Houses in Caldwell County, North Carolina
National Register of Historic Places in Caldwell County, North Carolina